Königs Wusterhausen is a railway station for the town of Königs Wusterhausen in Brandenburg. It is the southern terminus of the S-Bahn line .

Train services
The station is served by the following service(s):

Regional services  Wismar – Schwerin – Wittenberge – Nauen – Berlin – Königs Wusterhausen – Lübben – Cottbus
Local services  Berlin – Potsdam – Golm – Saarmund – Flughafen BER - Terminal 1-2 – Königs Wusterhausen
Local services  Eberswalde – Berlin – Königs Wusterhausen – Lübben – Senftenberg
Local services  Königs Wusterhausen – Beeskow – Frankfurt (Oder)
Berlin S-Bahn services  Westend - Westkreuz - Innsbrucker Platz - Südkreuz - Neukölln - Schöneweide - Grünau - Königs Wusterhausen

References

External links

Berlin S-Bahn stations
Railway stations in Brandenburg
Buildings and structures in Dahme-Spreewald
Railway stations in Germany opened in 1866
1866 establishments in Prussia